The 150 personae non gratae of Turkey is a list of high-ranking personages of the Ottoman Empire who were exiled from the Republic of Turkey shortly after the end of the Turkish War of Independence with the Armistice of Mudanya on 11 October 1922. The Sultanate was abolished by the Grand National Assembly of Turkey in Angora (Ankara) on 1 November 1922, and the last Ottoman Sultan, Mehmed VI, was declared persona non grata. Leaving Istanbul aboard the British warship HMS Malaya on 17 November 1922, he was sent into exile and died in Sanremo, Italy, on 16 May 1926.

The list was created on 23 April 1924, by the Grand National Assembly of Turkey, and revised on 1 June 1924. By targeting the former Imperial ruling-elite, it reaffirmed the political and cultural break between the Empire and the Republic. The preliminary list contained 600 individuals, negotiated down to its final form of 150 with the Treaty of Lausanne.

List

References

Further reading
 İlhami Soysal, Yüzellilikler, (Istanbul: Gür, 1985)
 Kâmil Erdeha, Article "Yüzellilikler", in Sosyalist Kültür Ansiklopedisi, vol. 8, pp. 1336–1341, Istanbul: May 1980

personae non gratae of, 150
personae non gratae of, 150